Wade A. Kimberlin (born Houston, Texas, in 1970) is the author of many science-fiction and fantasy short stories, and one science-fiction novel.

As Wade grew up in Houston, he got an early start reading the fantasy and science-fiction works of  Tolkien and Robert A. Heinlein. After high school, he went to study at Oklahoma Christian College, but remained undecided on a major. He left college in 1989 to join the United States Air Force, where he still serves today.

Even with working full-time and raising a family with wife Karin, Wade found time to write. He completed his first novel, a space opera called Electronic Echoes of the Mind, in 2001, which got picked up for publication by Mundania Press shortly thereafter.

Wade is working on a sequel to Electronic Echoes of the Mind.

External links
Electronic Echoes website
Mundania Press

1970 births
Living people
American male writers